Vasile "Vasko" Popa (29 June 1922 – 5 January 1991) was a Serbian poet.

Biography 

Popa was born in the village of Grebenac, Vojvodina, Yugoslavia (present-day Serbia). After finishing high school, he enrolled as a student at the University of Belgrade Faculty of Philosophy. He continued his studies at the University of Bucharest and in Vienna. During World War II, he fought as a partisan and was imprisoned in a German concentration camp in Bečkerek (today Zrenjanin, Serbia).

After the war in 1949, Popa graduated from the Romanic group of the Faculty of Philosophy at Belgrade University. He published his first poems in the magazines Književne novine (Literary Magazine) and the daily Borba (Struggle).

From 1954 until 1979, he was the editor of the publishing house Nolit. In 1953 he published his first major verse collection, Kora (Bark). His other important work included Nepočin-polje (No-Rest Field, 1956), Sporedno nebo (Secondary Heaven, 1968), Uspravna zemlja (Earth Erect, 1972), Vučja so (Wolf Salt, 1975), and Od zlata jabuka (Apple of Gold, 1978), an anthology of Serbian folk literature. His Collected Poems, 1943–1976, a compilation in English translation, appeared in 1978, with an introduction by the British poet Ted Hughes.

On 29 May 1972 Vasko Popa founded The Literary Municipality Vršac and originated a library of postcards, called Slobodno lišće (Free Leaves). In the same year, he was elected to become a member of the Serbian Academy of Sciences and Arts.

Vasko Popa was one of the founders of Vojvodina Academy of Sciences and Arts, established on 14 December 1979 in Novi Sad. He is the first laureate of the Branko's award (Brankova nagrada) for poetry, established in honour of the poet Branko Radičević. In the year 1957 Popa received another award for poetry, Zmaj's Award (Zmajeva nagrada), which honours the poet Jovan Jovanović Zmaj. In 1965 Popa received the Austrian state award for European literature. In 1976, he received the Branko Miljković poetry award, in 1978 the Yugoslav state Anti-Fascist Council for the National Liberation of Yugoslavia Award, and in 1983 the literary award Skender Kulenović.

Vasko Popa died on 5 January 1991 in Belgrade and is buried in the Aisle of the Deserving Citizens in Belgrade's New Cemetery. He was a good friend with French poet Alain Bosquet.

Popa was married to Jovanka "Hasha" Singer from his post-war move to Belgrade in the 1940s until the end of his life. In 2001, a year after her death, Hasha’s ashes were interred alongside Vasko’s remains.

Style 
Vasko Popa wrote in a succinct modernist style that owed much to surrealism and Serbian folk traditions (via the influence of Serbian poet Momčilo Nastasijević) and absolutely nothing to the Socialist Realism that dominated Eastern European literature after World War II. He created a unique poetic language, mostly elliptical, that combines a modern form, often expressed through colloquial speech and common idioms and phrases, with old, oral folk traditions of Serbia – epic and lyric poems, stories, myths, riddles, etc. In his work, earthly and legendary motifs mix, myths come to surface from the collective subconscious, the inheritance and everyday are in constant interplay, and the abstract is reflected in the specific and concrete, forming a unique and extraordinary poetic dialectics.

In The New York Times obituary, the author mentions that the English poet Ted Hughes lauded Popa as an "epic poet" with a "vast vision". Hughes states in his introduction to Vasko Popa: Collected Poems 1943-1976, translated by Anne Pennington, "As Popa penetrates deeper into his life, with book after book, it begins to look like a universe passing through a universe. It is one of the most exciting things in modern poetry, to watch this journey being made."

Mexican poet and Nobel laureate Octavio Paz said, "Poets have the gift to speak for others, Vasko Popa had the very rare quality of hearing the others."

Popa's Collected Poems translation by Anne Pennington with its introduction by Hughes is part of "The Persea Series of Poetry in Translation," general editor Daniel Weissbort. Premiere literary critic John Bayley of Oxford University reviewed the book in The New York Review of Books and wrote that Popa was "one of the best European poets writing today."

Since his first book of verse, Kora (Bark), Vasko Popa has gained steadily in stature and popularity. His poetic achievement – eight volumes of verse written over a period of 38 years – has received extensive critical acclaim both in his native land and beyond. He is one of the most translated Serbian poets and at the time he had become one of the most influential World poets.

Legacy 

In 1964, composer Darinka Simic-Mitrovic used Vasko Popa's text for her song cycle Vrati Mi Moje Krpice.

In 1995, the town of Vršac established a poetry award named after Vasko Popa. It was awarded annually for the best book of poetry published in Serbian. The award ceremony is held on the day of Popa's birthday, 29 June.

Works

Poetical oeuvre 
 Kora (Bark), 1953
 Nepočin polje (No-rest Field),1965
 Sporedno nebo (Secondary Heaven), 1968
 Uspravna zemlja (Earth Erect) 1972
 Vučja so (Wolf's Salt), 1975
 Kuća nasred druma (Home in the Middle of the Road), 1975
 Živo meso (Raw Meat), 1975
 Rez (The Cut), 1981
 Gvozdeni sad (Iron Plantage), unfinished

Collections oeuvre 
 Od zlata jabuka (Apple of Gold), a collection of folk poems, tales, proverbs, riddles, and curses selected from the vast body of Yugoslav folk literature, 1958
 Urnebesnik: Zbornik pesničkog humora (Pealing Man: Collection of poetic Humour), a selection of Serbian wit and humor, 1960
 Ponoćno Sunce (Midnight Sun), a collection of poetic dream visions, 1962

Major literary works available in English 
Vasko Popa (NYRB Poets), selected and translated by Charles Simic (NYRB, 2019), ISBN 978-1681373362
Complete Poems., ed. Francis R. Jones, co-tr. Anne Pennington, introduction Ted Hughes. Anvil, 2011.
 The Star Wizard's Legacy: Six Poetic Sequences, trans. Morton Marcus (White Pine Press, 2010), 
 Collected Poems, Anvil Press Poetry, 1998
 Homage to the Lame Wolf: Selected Poems, trans. Charles Simic (Oberlin College Press, 1987), 
 Golden Apple, Anvil P Poetry, 1980
 Vasko Popa: Collected Poems 1943-1976, trans. Anne Pennington (Persea Books of New York, 1978)
 Earth Erect, Anvil P Poetry, 1973

References

External links 

 Biographical information
 Give Me Back My rags, Translated by Charles Simic
 Poem Hunter, All Poems of Vasko Popa
 A Shepherd of Wolves? Eleven Poems by Vasko Popa, translated by Anthony Weir
 Poem no. 22 from the "Far Inside Us" collection by Vasko Popa, translated by Lazar Pascanovic
 Poem "If not for Your Eyes" by Vasko Popa, translated by Lazar Pascanovic
 Poem "Kalenics" by Vasko Popa, translated by Lazar Pascanovic
 Vasko Popa in Persian Anthology of World Poetry
 Translated works by Vasko Popa

1922 births
1991 deaths
People from Bela Crkva
Serbian male poets
Yugoslav poets
University of Bucharest alumni
Yugoslav Partisans members
University of Belgrade Faculty of Philosophy alumni
Serbian people of Romanian descent
20th-century Serbian poets
Burials at Belgrade New Cemetery
Romanians of Vojvodina